Toon-A-Vision is a Canadian English language discretionary service television channel owned by Atlantic Digital Networks. The channel broadcasts in high definition and airs animated programming aimed at youth ranging from preschoolers to teenagers. Its name is a portmanteau of "cartoon" and "television".

History
Atlantic Digital Networks received Category B-exemption from the Canadian Radio-television and Telecommunications Commission (CRTC) for a television service called "Atlantic Cartoon" in 2014. The channel, now known as Toon-A-Vision, launched on Eastlink cable systems throughout Canada in high definition on June 19, 2018. It was developed in conjunction with Huminah Huminah Animation. On July 15, 2019, Atlantic Digital Networks requested the CRTC transfer the channel to a full license after surpassing the commission's subscriber threshold. Its license was approved on September 1, 2020.

The channel was added to Bell Satellite TV and Bell Fibe on December 5, 2019. Cogeco launched the channel on its platforms on April 22, 2020. The channel is expected to be launched on Shaw Direct in 2022.

Programming

Current programming

 ABC Monsters
 Albi the Snowman
 Blue Fish Nursery Rhymes
 Buzz Bumble
 Chaotic
 Chilly Beach
 Chuck Chicken
 Devilled Eggz
 Dex Hamilton: Alien Entomologist
 Dive, Olly, Dive
 Doki
 Dragamonz
 Eddie is a Yeti
 Future Card Buddyfight X
 G2G: Got To Go!
 Ghosts of Time
 GoGo Dino Explorers
 Hatchimals: Adventures in Hatchtopia
 The Hive
 I'm A Dinosaur
 I.N.K. Invisible Network of Kids
 Jack
 Jar Dwellers SOS
 Kagagi: The Raven
 Kikoriki
 Leon
 Maddie's Do You Know?
 Manon
 Maple Shorts
 Mia
 Mofy
 My Goldfish Is Evil
 Oh Yuck!
 Origanimals
 Pet Alien
 Pet Squad
 Pin Code
 Redakai
 Ricky Sprocket: Showbiz Boy
 Sindbad & the 7 Galaxies
 Skyland
 Smighties
 Talking Tom and Friends
 Tenkai Knights
 The Fairytaler
 Timeblazers
 Tina and Tony
 Toot the Tiny Tugboat
 Wild Grinders
 WonderBalls!
 Yam Roll
 Zo Zo Zombie

Reruns
 The Adventures of Annie & Ben (September 2021)
 Bat Pat (November 27, 2021)

Former Programming

 Aesop's Theater
 Baby Genius
 Best Ed
 Bunny Ninja
 Ever After High
 Get Well Soon
 Gisele and the Green Team
 Hareport
 The Haunting Hour: The Series
 Horrid Henry
 King Arthur's Disasters
 Kipper
 Little Princess
 Magic Academy
 Martha & Friends
 Monster by Mistake
 Monster High
 Parallel Parker
 PAW Patrol
 Percy the Park Keeper
 Pingu
 Secret Millionaires Club
 Skunk Fu!
 Space POP
 Thomas Edison's Secret Lab
 Tom and the Slice of Bread with Strawberry Jam and Honey
 Uncle Joe's Cartoon Playhouse
 WrestleVille
 Yu-Gi-Oh! Zexal

References

External links
 

English-language television stations in Canada
Digital cable television networks in Canada
Children's television networks in Canada
Companies based in Nova Scotia
Television channels and stations established in 2018
Anime television
HD-only channels
2018 establishments in Canada